The following is a list of notable deaths in January 2003.

Entries for each day are listed alphabetically by surname. A typical entry lists information in the following sequence:
 Name, age, country of citizenship at birth, subsequent country of citizenship (if applicable), reason for notability, cause of death (if known), and reference.

January 2003

1
Royce D. Applegate, 63, American actor (seaQuest DSV, Diff'rent Strokes, Dallas, Home Improvement).
Pat Daly, 75, Irish football player.
Joe Foss, 87, American politician, fighter pilot, recipient of the Medal of Honor.
Giorgio Gaber, 63, Italian singer-songwriter and playwright.
Cyril Shaps, 79, British actor (The Pianist, Doctor Who, The Spy Who Loved Me).
David Young, 72, British politician (Member of Parliament for Bolton East, Bolton South East).

2
Peter Harris, 77, British footballer.
Eric Jupp, 80, British-Australian musician, composer, arranger and conductor.
Jack Keller, 80, American comic book artist.
Bud Metheny, 87, American baseball player (New York Yankees).
Sydney Omarr, 76, American astrologer and newspaper columnist, heart attack.
Sir Bill Shelton, 73, British politician.
Leroy Warriner, 83, American midget car racing driver (National Midget Auto Racing Hall of Fame).

3
Henry Botterell, 106, Canadian World War I fighter pilot (Royal Naval Air Service, Royal Air Force).
Sir James Eyre, 72, British army general.
Sid Gillman, 91, American football coach (San Diego Chargers) and member of the Pro Football Hall of Fame.
George Makgill, 13th Viscount of Oxfuird, 68, British aristocrat and politician.
Joe Ostrowski, 86, American baseball player (St. Louis Browns, New York Yankees).
Jim Westlake, 72, American baseball player (Philadelphia Phillies).
Claude Wharton, 88, Australian politician.
Harry Willsie, 74, Canadian Olympic sports shooter (1964 men's trap, 1968 mixed skeet, 1976 mixed skeet).
Monique Wittig, 67, French writer, poet and social theorist, known for her contributions to feminist thought.

4
Raymond Aker, 82, American scholar and authority on Francis Drake.
Conrad Hall, 76, American cinematographer (American Beauty, Cool Hand Luke, Road to Perdition), Oscar winner (1970, 2000, 2003), complications from bladder cancer.
Klementyna Mankowska, 92, Polish resistance activist and spy.
Yfrah Neaman, 79, Lebanese-born British violinist and teacher.
Louis Spector, 84, American judge (United States Court of Federal Claims).
Lila Zali, 84, Georgian-American prima ballerina and ballet director, founded Ballet Pacifica in Irvine, California.

5
Buzz Busby, 69, American bluegrass mandolinist, songwriter and bandleader.
Massimo Girotti, 84, Italian film actor, heart attack.
Roy Jenkins, 82, British politician and biographer.
Jean Kerr, 80, American author and playwright, pneumonia.
King Biscuit Boy, 58, Canadian blues musician.
Daphne Oram, 77, British composer and musician.
Ray Scott, 75, Australian football player and umpire.
Hiram D. Williams, 85, American artist and art professor at the University of Florida.

6
Andrew Batavia, 45, American lawyer, teacher, author and disability rights activist.
Olle Bexell, 93, Swedish decathlete (1936 Olympic decathlon; Swedish champion: 1935 to 1938 decathlon,  1938 pentathlon).
Vic Bottari, 86, American college football player (Cal Bears), 1938 Rose Bowl MVP, College Football Hall of Fame.
Sir Gerald Cash, 85, Governor-General of the Bahamas.
Glyn Davies, 83, Welsh economist.
Sir Peter Matthews, 85, British police officer.
Jarvis Tatum, 56, American baseball player (California Angels).
Sir Philip Ward, 78, British army general.
Harry Woolf, 79, American professor, historian and administrator, director of Institute for Advanced Study.

7
Ed Albosta, 84, American baseball player (Brooklyn Dodgers, Pittsburgh Pirates).
Ken Biddulph, 70, British cricketer.
Montagu Dawson, 83, British World War II bombardier.
Edith Hirsch, 103, German-born American economist.
Gordon Kidd Teal, 95, American electrical engineer.
Beatrice Willard, 77, American botanist, known for her research in alpine tundra ecosystems.
Siggi Wilzig, 76, Prussian (Polish)-American Holocaust survivor and business executive.

8
Simeon Aké, 71, Ivorian politician.
Ron Goodwin, 77, British film music composer and conductor.
Sarah McClendon, 92, American journalist and White House reporter.
Patrick Pery, 6th Earl of Limerick, 72, Irish aristocrat and public servant.
Angelo Romani, 69, Italian swimmer.
Billy Van, 68, Canadian comedian, actor and singer (Nightcap, The Hilarious House of Frightenstein).

9
Elizabeth Irving, 98, British actress.
Don Landrum, 66, American baseball player (Philadelphia Phillies, St. Louis Cardinals, Chicago Cubs, San Francisco Giants).
Lloyd Monserratt, 36, American political activist, complications following surgery.
Peter Tinniswood, 66, British writer.
Penny Valentine, 59, British music journalist and critic.
Steve Young, 50, American national president of the Fraternal Order of Police.

10
C. Douglas Dillon, 93, American diplomat (U.S. Ambassador to France) and politician (Secretary of the Treasury, National Security Council).
Jorge "Lobito" Martínez, 50, Paraguan musician, murdered.
Donald Nestor, 64, British suffragan bishop in Lesotho.
O. Arthur Stiennon, 83, American clinical radiologist and radiation treatment pioneer.
Alex Weir, 86, Scottish football player and manager.
George M. Wyckoff Jr., 74, American steel company owner, executive and politician (mayor of Cumberland, Maryland).
Denis Zanette, 32, Italian professional racing cyclist.

11
Ruth Feldman, 91, American poet and translator.
Mickey Finn, 55, band member of T. Rex.
Sir Anthony Havelock-Allan, 98, British producer and screenwriter.
Maurice Pialat, 77, French movie director.
Masato Sako, 56, Japanese actor.
Richard Simmons, 89, American actor, Sgt William Preston on TV's Sergeant Preston of the Yukon.
George Waters, 87, American business executive, transformed American Express Card into a global brand.

12
Dean Amadon, 90, American ornithologist and an authority on birds of prey.
Clarence H. Burns, 84, American politician, mayor of Baltimore in 1987.
Jack Douglas, 72, Canadian Olympic ice hockey player.
Leopoldo Fortunato Galtieri, 76, former dictator of Argentina.
Maurice Gibb, 53, British band member of Bee Gees.
Alan Nunn May, 91, British nuclear physicist and convicted Soviet spy.
Paul Pender, 72, American boxer.
Koloman Sokol, 100, Slovak artist.
Wang Tieya, 89, Chinese jurist and Judge of the International Criminal Tribunal for the Former Yugoslavia.

13
James Bradshaw Adamson, 81, American U.S. Army major general, commander of the Military District of Washington.
Andreas Holm, 96, Norwegian politician.
Elisabeth Croft, 95, English actress (Crossroads).
Norman Panama, 88, screenwriter and director.
Ernie Rudolph, 93, American baseball player (Brooklyn Dodgers).
Martin Ryan, 79, English rugby player.

14
Mirza Babayev, 89, Azerbaijani actor and singer.
Robert Bart, 72, French sprinter (men's 4 × 400 metres relay, men's 400 metres hurdles at the 1952 Summer Olympics).
Mel Bourne, 79, American set designer and art director (Annie Hall, Fatal Attraction, Manhunter).
Alan Edwards, 77, Australian actor.
Monica Furlong, 72, British author, journalist, and activist.
Earl Lawson, 79, American sportswriter, cancer.
Paul Monash, 85, American television and film producer and screenwriter, pancreatic cancer.
Sujit Mukherjee, 72, Indian writer,  literary critic and publisher.
Stephen Oake, 40, English police officer with Greater Manchester Police, murdered while attempting to arrest an Islamic terrorist.
Johnny Ritchey, 80, American baseball player.

15
Linda Braidwood, 93, American archaeologist and pre-historian.
Robert John Braidwood, 95, American archaeologist and anthropologist, a leading pioneer in prehistoric archaeology.
Shimon Garidi, 90, Israeli politician.
Gladys Kamakakuokalani Brandt, 96, American educator, civic leader and a champion of Hawaiian culture.
Jeannette Campbell, 86, Scottish-Argentine swimmer (silver medal in women's 100m freestyle at the 1936 Summer Olympics).
Frank Drea, 69, Canadian journalist, broadcaster, and politician, pneumonia.
Doris Fisher, 87, American singer and songwriter ("Put the Blame on Mame", "You Always Hurt the One You Love").
Vivi-Anne Hultén, 91, Swedish figure skater (Olympic figure skating ladies singles: 1932, 1936 bronze medal), heart failure.
Russell Pepperell, 84, English rugby player.
Eleanore Pettersen, 86, American architect.
John Harry Robertson, British crystallographer.

16
Fernand Dorais, 74, Canadian writer, Jesuit priest and academic.
Bruce Juddery, 61, Australian journalist.
Alfred Kantor, 79, Czech-born Holocaust survivor, artist and author of The Book of Alfred Kantor.
Phil McCullough, 85, American baseball player (Washington Senators).
Chris Mead, 62, British ornithologist, author and broadcaster.
Susie Bootja Bootja Napaltjarri, Australian indigenous artist.
Hans Pietsch, 34, German professional Go player.
Ray Owen, 97, Australian agricultural scientist and politician.
Richard Wainwright, 84, British politician (Member of Parliament for Colne Valley).

17
Alden G. Barber, 83, American professional Scouter for the Boy Scouts of America (fifth Chief Scout Executive).
Annie Barnes, 99, Swiss-English scholar, Reader in French literature and an expert on Pascal.
Hylo Brown, 80, American bluegrass and country music singer, guitarist and bass player.
Fritzi Burr, 78, American actress (Once Upon a Mattress, Funny Girl, Fiddler on the Roof).
Richard Crenna, 74, American actor (First Blood, Summer Rental, The Real McCoys), heart failure.
Herbert Crüger, 91, German communist and political activist.
George Haimsohn, 77, American writer and photographer.
Sao Nang Hearn Kham, 86, First Lady of Myanmar.

18
Harivansh Rai Bachchan, 95, Indian poet.
Ed Farhat, 76, Lebanese-American wrestler, dheart failure.
Virginia Heinlein, 86, American chemist, biochemist and engineer.
Gavin Lyall, 70, English author of espionage thrillers, cancer.
Renée Short, 83, British Labour Party politician.
Boris Struminsky, 63, Russian and Ukrainian physicist.

19
Milton Flores, 28, Honduran football player, killed by automatic weapons fire.
Eric Frodsham, 79, English rugby league footballer.
Françoise Giroud, 86, French journalist, screenwriter, writer and politician.
Joy Hodges, 87, American singer and actress.
Morris Kight, 83, American gay rights pioneer and peace activist.
L. D. Meyer, 87, American baseball player (Chicago Cubs, Detroit Tigers, Cleveland Indians) and manager.
Russell A. Rourke, 71, American lawyer and public official.

20
David Battley, 67, British actor (Willy Wonka & the Chocolate Factory, Krull, Relative Strangers), heart attack.
Sir Stanley Fingland, 83, British diplomat.
Al Hirschfeld, 99, American caricaturist.
Marcel Jovine, 81, Italian-American sculptor.
Tony O'Malley, 89, Irish artist and painter.
Nedra Volz, 94, American actress (Diff'rent Strokes, The Dukes of Hazzard, Filthy Rich, The Fall Guy).
Bill Werbeniuk, 56, Canadian snooker player.

21
William Cronk Elmore, 93, American physicist, educator, and author.
Paul Kuusberg, 86, Estonian writer.
Obert Logan, 61, American football player (Trinity University, Dallas Cowboys, New Orleans Saints), colon cancer.
Antonio Domínguez Ortiz, 93, Spanish historian.
Khin Hnin Yu, 77, Burmese writer (Hmwe), spokesperson for Burmese Prime Minister U Nu.

22
George Aitken, 77, Scottish footballer.
Marvin Bower, 99, American management consultant, considered the father of modern management consulting.
Richard Buchanan, 90, British politician (Member of Parliament for Glasgow Springburn).
Ernst Kitzinger, 90, German-American art historian.
Bill Mauldin, 81, American World War II cartoonist.
Peter Russell, 81, British poet.
Tan Qilong, 90, Chinese politician, head of four provinces.
Fred M. Winner, 90, American judge (U.S. District Judge of the U.S. District Court for the District of Colorado).

23
Anne Meredith Barry, 70, Canadian artist, known for her landscapes of Newfoundland and Labrador.
Harlan E. Boyles, 73, American public servant and politician (North Carolina State Treasurer).
Nell Carter, 54, singer, actress (Gimme a Break!, Hangin' with Mr. Cooper, The Grass Harp).
John Clarke, 57, Canadian mountaineer.
Stanley J. Davis, 94, American politician.
David Moore, 75, Australian photojournalist.

24
Gianni Agnelli, 81, Italian entrepreneur and president of Fiat.
Lucien Blackwell, 71, American politician (U.S. Representative for Pennsylvania's 2nd congressional district).
Sir Ivor Broom, 82, British air marshal and World War II bomber pilot.
Ingeborg Kattinger, 92, Austrian chess player.
Bobbi Trout, 97, American pioneer aviator,.

25
Toby Atwell, 78, American baseball player (Chicago Cubs, Pittsburgh Pirates, Milwaukee Braves).
Diana Gould, Baroness Menuhin, 90, British dancer and widow of Yehudi Menuhin.
Sidney Hatfield, 73, American baseball player.
Scylla Médici, 95, Brazilian First Lady.
Cliff Norton, 84, American actor (The Ed Sullivan Show, Caesar's Hour, Harry and Tonto, Funny Lady).
Robert Rockwell, 82, American actor (Our Miss Brooks, Growing Pains, Lassie).
Joseph A. Walker, 67, American playwright (Tony Award for Best Play for The River Niger), director, actor and professor.
Samuel Weems, 66, American writer and disbarred lawyer.
Stanley Wudyka, 92, American Olympic long-distance runner (men's 10,000 metres at the 1936 Summer Olympics).

26
John Browning, 69, American pianist, winner of two Grammy Awards: 1991, 1993.
Valeriy Brumel, 60, Soviet high jumper (men's Olympic high jump medals: 1960 silver, 1964 gold).
Vladimir Mulyavin, 62, Belarusian and Russian rock musician, complications after car accident.
Annemarie Schimmel, 80, German orientalist and scholar.
Hugh Trevor-Roper, 89, English historian.
Fred Russell, 96, American sports writer.
George Younger, 71, British politician, Secretary of State for Scotland 1979–1986.

27
Louis Archambault, 87, Canadian sculptor.
Maurice Ash, 85, British environmentalist, writer and administrator.
Paul Burrough, 86, English Bishop of Mashonaland from 1968 to 1981.
Bob Kammeyer, 52, American baseball player (New York Yankees).

28
Jerry Kratz, 69, American politician.
Miloš Milutinović, 69, Serbian footballer and manager.
Emília Rotter, 96, Hungarian figure skater.
John Philp Thompson, Sr., 77, American businessman (7-Eleven).
Vladimir Vasilyev, 67, Soviet Olympic sailor
Edward Preston Young, 89, British graphic designer, submariner, writer (One Of Our Submarines).

29
Ihsan Abbas, 82, Palestinian professor
Douglas Allanbrook, 81, American composer, pianist and harpsichordist.
Pandari Bai, 73, Indian actress.
George Dews, 81, English cricketer.
Leslie Fiedler, 85, American literary critic.
László Kákosy, 70, Hungarian Egyptologist, member of the Hungarian Academy of Sciences.
Frank Moss, 91, American lawyer and politician, United States Senator from Utah.
Peter Shaw, 84, British actor and producer; husband of Angela Lansbury.
Sir Alan Walker, 91, Australian theologian.

30
Mary Ellis, 105, American actress and singer (Rose-Marie, Music in the Air).
Paul-André Meyer, 68, French mathematician.
Joan Franks Williams, 72, American composer, complications from Parkinson's disease.

31
Julie Alexander, 64, British model and actress, Alzheimer's disease.
Horace Hahn, 87, American actor.
Peter Guy Ottewill, 87, British World War II RAF officer.
Meka Rangaiah Appa Rao, 87, Indin Raja freedom activist.
John Westergaard, 71, American investment manager.

References 

2003-01
 01